A crampon is a traction device that is attached to footwear to improve mobility on snow and ice during ice climbing. Besides ice climbing, crampons are also used for secure travel on snow and ice, such as crossing glaciers, snowfields and icefields, ascending snow slopes, and scaling ice-covered rock. 

There are three main attachment systems for footwear: step-in, hybrid, and strap bindings. The first two require boots with welts, or specialized mountaineering boots with dedicated front and rear lugs, as a cam-action lever attaches the crampon to the heel. The last type (strap bindings) are more versatile and can adapt to virtually any boot or shoe, but often do not fit as precisely as the other two types.

Oscar Eckenstein designed the first 10-point crampon in 1908, dramatically reducing the need for step cutting. This design was then made commercially available by the Italian Henry Grivel.

Characteristics

Materials
Crampons are made of steel alloy, light weight aluminium, or a combination of the two. Lighter weight crampons are popular for alpine ski touring where demands are generally lower and light weight a premium.

Points
Early 10-point crampons lacked forward angled spikes and thus required step cutting on steep terrain. In the 1930s two additional forward-slanting points were added, making them exceptional for mountaineering and glacier travel and beginning a revolution in front pointing. There is currently a range of models, including specialized crampons with as many as 14 points and models with single points for ice climbing.

Attachment
Crampons are fastened to footwear by means of a binding system. Improved attachment systems – such as a cam action "step-in" system similar to a ski binding and particularly well adapted to plastic technical mountaineering boots - have widely increased crampon use.  Crampons also use a full "strap-in" system and a "hybrid" binding that features a toe strap at the front and a heel lever at the back.

Anti-balling
To prevent snow from balling up under crampons, especially in temperatures around freezing, most models can be fitted with plastic or rubber "anti-balling" systems to reduce build-up.  Rubber models use flexion to repel snow while plastic anti-balling plates employ a hydrophobic surface to prevent adhesion.

Grades
Crampons are graded C1, C2 and C3 relative to their flexibility and general compatibility with different styles of boots. No crampons are suitable for B0 boots (flexible walking boots).

Ski crampons
Specialized "ski crampons" are employed in ski mountaineering on hard snow and ice. Far more common in the Alps than in the United States, these ski crampons are known by their European names: Harscheisen (German), couteaux (French) and coltelli (Italian), literally French and Italian for "knives" in those languages.

Microspikes 
While crampons generally have a solid frame, large spikes, and may only be attached to a mountaineering boot, microspikes typically are flexible rubber or metal chains with more, smaller spikes. Since crampons are tighter and have larger spikes, they are typically used for mountaineering on steep and dense snow or glacial ice in order to maintain strong traction and avoid falls, whereas microspikes may be attached to multiple types of shoes and are generally used for hiking on flatter surfaces such as snow or even gravel or dirt.

See also
Ice cleats
Cleats

References

External links

Crampon Review from Climbing Magazine, No. 226, December 2003.

Footwear accessories
Mountaineering equipment